Terra Sancta College and Terra Santa College may refer to

 ; founded in 1996 as Terra Sancta College
 , called Terra Santa College in the interwar period

See also 
 Custody of the Holy Land, Latin: Custodia Terræ Sanctæ